Film City or Dadasaheb Phalke Chitra Nagari  is an integrated film studio complex situated near Sanjay Gandhi National Park in Goregaon East, Mumbai in India. It has several recording rooms, gardens, lakes, theatres and grounds that serve as the venue of many Bollywood and Marathi films. It was built in 1977 by the state government to provide facilities and concessions to the film industry. The plan for Film City was prepared and executed under the guidance of V. Shantaram. It was renamed Dadasaheb Phalke Chitra Nagari in 2001 in memory of India's first producer-director-screenwriter Dadasaheb Phalke, who is considered as father of the Indian film industry. It has been the shooting location for almost all Bollywood films. It has many types of location available for shooting including permanent sets of a temple, prison, court, lake, mountains, fountains, villages, picnic spots, gardens and a man-made waterfall.

Film City spans more than 520 acres in the suburbs of Mumbai and has approximately 42 outdoor shooting locations and 16 studios.

Geography 
Film City is situated in Goregaon (East) neighbourhood of Mumbai near Aarey colony. It is surrounded by jungle. Wild animals such as leopards have habitat in this jungle and sometimes it is also called as Film City jungle. Leopard sightings are normal in this area. Some incidents also have been reported of leopard attack on humans. The jungle, which is designated as national park is protected forest but the boundary between Film City and Sanjay Gandhi National Park is not clearly defined. It alleged that the land of Aarey colony and the park was fraudulently sold.

Workforce
Approximately 800 people work in the studio's eight filming locations on any given day.

Services

Tours
In 2014 the tourism board of Maharashtra started guided tours of the studio, each ticket costing about ₹650.

See also
 Noida Film City
 Ramoji Film City, Hyderabad
 Cinema of India
 Film and Television Institute of India, Pune
 State Institute of Film and Television

References

External links

Perry, Alex (27 June 2005). "Best of Asia: Best for the Mind: Film City Bombay, India". Time. 
S., Paavan (10 June 2013). "Maximum Number of Shootings in a Single Day in Multiple Location New World Record". World Records India.
"The Film City". Secret World.

Hindi cinema
Film studios in Mumbai